Bendtsen is a surname. Notable people with the surname include:

Andrea West Bendtsen (born 1999), Danish handball player
Bendt Bendtsen (born 1954), Danish politician 
Wermund Bendtsen (1917–2003), Danish professional photographer, filmmaker, and photojournalist

See also
 Bentsen

Danish-language surnames